

Squad

Out on loan

References

Adanaspor
Turkish football clubs 2019–20 season